Carl Lind may refer to:

 Carl Johan Lind (1883–1965), Swedish athlete who competed in the 1912 Summer Olympics
Carl Lind (baseball) (1903–1946), Major League Baseball second baseman
Carl Lind (Paralympic athlete), Swedish athlete

See also 
 Karl Lind, wrestler